Jeroen Godfried Tel (born 19 May 1972), also known as WAVE, is a Dutch composer. He is best known for numerous computer game tunes he wrote in the 1980s and early 1990s for the Commodore 64. His most popular compositions appear in the following Commodore 64 games: Combat Crazy, Cybernoid, Cybernoid II, Dan Dare 3, Eliminator, Hawkeye, Myth: History in the Making, Nighthunter, Robocop 3, Rubicon (title music), and Supremacy.

Maniacs of Noise
Alongside Charles Deenen, who Tel met at computer meetings in Venlo, Netherlands, Tel is a founding member of the computer music group Maniacs of Noise, a company devoted to composing music and designing sound effects for videogames since 1987. He worked for several years at Funcom in Norway. In addition to being a game musician, he has composed lots of modules in the context of demo scene.

Tess & Tel
In late 2014 Jeroen Tel joined forces with Swedish singer and songwriter Tess Fries and formed the Pixel Pop music group Tess & Tel.

They first met at a Space Invaders concert in Odense, Denmark on October 4, 2013.

Tess & Tel discography

Tel Me More
In the summer of 2015, Tel launched a crowdfunding campaign on Indiegogo
in order to produce a remix album (called 'Tel Me More') of his best C64 music. Of the $38,911 (a nod to the amount of free memory bytes when starting up a Commodore 64) goal, $27,420 was reached by a total of 699 backers. On August 8, 2015, Tel gave an update on his Indiegogo page stating that this was sufficient to create the album and deliver all the promised perks. In posts on the campaign page, he claimed to still be working on completing the project as of February 2020. However, in the beginning of February, 2022, the project was marked as closed without any comment from Jeroen.

Discography

Soundtracks by Jeroen Tel

References

External links
 Tess & Tel on Youtube
 
 Maniacs of Noise Website.
 Jeroen Tel on Amiga Music Preservation
 GamesArt.de Interview.
 Artist profile at OverClocked ReMix
 Indiegogo 'Tel Me More' campaign by Jeroen Tel
 Jeroen Tel - Artist profile at Discogs
 Jeroen Tel - Artist profile at VGMdb
 Jeroen Tel - Biography at IMDb
 Jeroen Tel

1972 births
Living people
Dutch composers
Video game composers
Video game musicians
Commodore 64 music
Demosceners
People from Helmond
Dutch electronic musicians
Chiptune musicians
8bitpeoples artists
Renoise users